Maness is an American surname of Dutch origin.  Germanic settlers from Holland settled the low-lying coastal areas of the Carolinas in the 17th and 18th centuries, but did not own slaves. Notable people with the surname include:

Jack Maness, American singer-songwriter, guitarist, and keyboardist
Ryan Maness, American cybersecurity expert and co-author
Seth Maness (born 1988), American baseball pitcher